Novovladimirskoye (Görbüv) is a rural locality (a selo) in Chernyayevsky Selsoviet, Kizlyarsky District, Republic of Dagestan, Russia. The population was 774 as of 2010. There are 6 streets.

Geography 
Novovladimirskoye is located 25 km northeast of Kizlyar (the district's administrative centre) by road. Burumbay, Persidskoye and Chernyayevka are the nearest rural localities.

Nationalities 
Nogais, Kumyks, Avars, Azerbaijanis, Dargins and Russians live there.

References 

Rural localities in Kizlyarsky District